The Banda Island dtella (Gehyra barea) is a species of gecko in the genus Gehyra, native to the Banda Islands.

References

Gehyra
Reptiles described in 1926